The Colne Valley by-election was a Parliamentary by-election held on 18 July 1907. The constituency returned one Member of Parliament (MP) to the House of Commons of the United Kingdom, elected by the first past the post voting system.

Vacancy
Sir James Kitson had been Liberal MP for the seat of Colne Valley since the 1892 general election. He was created Baron Airedale on 17 July 1907 and resigned to take a seat in the House of Lords.

Electoral history
The seat was re-gained from the Liberal Unionists in 1892:

Candidates

The local Liberal Association selected Philip Bright to defend the seat. He was the son of John Bright the famous Free-trader. The Conservatives selected 35-year-old barrister, Granville Charles Hastings Wheler, later 1st (and last) Baronet of Otterden, as their candidate. He had contested Osgoldcross at the last general election.

Twenty-six-year-old Victor Grayson stood as an Independent Labour candidate, having been nominated by the Colne Valley Labour League.  This was the local branch of the Independent Labour Party (ILP), but the ILP and Labour Party both decided against backing Grayson's candidacy.  Grayson was born in Liverpool and became an apprentice engineer. He joined the Independent Labour Party and toured the country giving lectures, becoming a well-known orator despite having a stammer.

Polling Day was fixed for 18 July 1907.

Result
Grayson gained the seat:

Aftermath
Wheler was elected at Faversham at the next general election. Grayson was defeated by a new Liberal candidate:

References

Colne Valley by-election
Colne Valley
Elections in Kirklees
Colne Valley by-election
By-elections to the Parliament of the United Kingdom in West Yorkshire constituencies
1900s in Yorkshire
Colne Valley by-election